The Finnish Cup was the national ice hockey cup competition in Finland. It was played from 1955-1958 and from 1964-1971. The Finnish Cup returned to the competition program in autumn 2017. It was attended by all Mestis and Suomi-sarja teams and 27 teams in 2. Divisioona, that is, a total of 54 teams.

Champions

References

Defunct ice hockey competitions in Finland
Defunct national ice hockey cup competitions in Europe